Jesse Howard Altenburg (January 2, 1893 – March 12, 1973) was a Major League Baseball player. Altenburg played the outfield and batted left-handed and threw right-handed. He died in Lansing, Michigan.

External links

1893 births
1973 deaths
People from Gratiot County, Michigan
Pittsburgh Pirates players
Major League Baseball outfielders
Baseball players from Michigan
Minor league baseball managers
Youngstown Steelmen players
Wheeling Stogies players
Toronto Maple Leafs (International League) players
Kansas City Blues (baseball) players
Birmingham Barons players
Reading Coal Barons players
Reading Marines players
Newark Bears (IL) players
Albany Senators players